Following are lists of members of the New South Wales Legislative Council:

 Members of the New South Wales Legislative Council, 1823–1843
 Members of the New South Wales Legislative Council, 1843–1851
 Members of the New South Wales Legislative Council, 1851–1856
 Members of the New South Wales Legislative Council, 1856–1861
 Members of the New South Wales Legislative Council, 1861–1864
 Members of the New South Wales Legislative Council, 1864–1869
 Members of the New South Wales Legislative Council, 1869–1872
 Members of the New South Wales Legislative Council, 1872–1874
 Members of the New South Wales Legislative Council, 1874–1877
 Members of the New South Wales Legislative Council, 1877–1880
 Members of the New South Wales Legislative Council, 1880–1882
 Members of the New South Wales Legislative Council, 1882–1885
 Members of the New South Wales Legislative Council, 1885–1887
 Members of the New South Wales Legislative Council, 1887–1889
 Members of the New South Wales Legislative Council, 1889–1891
 Members of the New South Wales Legislative Council, 1891–1894
 Members of the New South Wales Legislative Council, 1894–1895
 Members of the New South Wales Legislative Council, 1895–1898
 Members of the New South Wales Legislative Council, 1898–1901
 Members of the New South Wales Legislative Council, 1901–1904
 Members of the New South Wales Legislative Council, 1904–1907
 Members of the New South Wales Legislative Council, 1907–1910
 Members of the New South Wales Legislative Council, 1910–1913
 Members of the New South Wales Legislative Council, 1913–1917
 Members of the New South Wales Legislative Council, 1917–1920
 Members of the New South Wales Legislative Council, 1920–1922
 Members of the New South Wales Legislative Council, 1922–1925
 Members of the New South Wales Legislative Council, 1925–1927
 Members of the New South Wales Legislative Council, 1927–1930
 Members of the New South Wales Legislative Council, 1930–1932
 Members of the New South Wales Legislative Council, 1932–1934
 Members of the New South Wales Legislative Council, 1934–1937
 Members of the New South Wales Legislative Council, 1937–1940
 Members of the New South Wales Legislative Council, 1940–1943
 Members of the New South Wales Legislative Council, 1943–1946
 Members of the New South Wales Legislative Council, 1946–1949
 Members of the New South Wales Legislative Council, 1949–1952
 Members of the New South Wales Legislative Council, 1952–1955
 Members of the New South Wales Legislative Council, 1955–1958
 Members of the New South Wales Legislative Council, 1958–1961
 Members of the New South Wales Legislative Council, 1961–1964
 Members of the New South Wales Legislative Council, 1964–1967
 Members of the New South Wales Legislative Council, 1967–1970
 Members of the New South Wales Legislative Council, 1970–1973
 Members of the New South Wales Legislative Council, 1973–1976
 Members of the New South Wales Legislative Council, 1976–1978
 Members of the New South Wales Legislative Council, 1978–1981
 Members of the New South Wales Legislative Council, 1981–1984
 Members of the New South Wales Legislative Council, 1984–1988
 Members of the New South Wales Legislative Council, 1988–1991
 Members of the New South Wales Legislative Council, 1991–1995
 Members of the New South Wales Legislative Council, 1995–1999
 Members of the New South Wales Legislative Council, 1999–2003
 Members of the New South Wales Legislative Council, 2003–2007
 Members of the New South Wales Legislative Council, 2007–2011
 Members of the New South Wales Legislative Council, 2011–2015
 Members of the New South Wales Legislative Council, 2015–2019
 Members of the New South Wales Legislative Council, 2019–2023